L'Envol (The Flight) is a bronze statue of Belgian singer Jacques Brel, sculpted by Tom Frantzen. It was inaugurated on the / in Brussels, Belgium, on 11 October 2017.

Statue
The statue depicts Jacques Brel singing in front of a microphone, whilst opening his arms in passion. It is located in the same street as the Brel Foundation. The title L'Envol (The Flight) refers to the line "Mille fois je pris mon envol" ("A thousand times I took my flight") from Brel's song La Chanson des Vieux Amants.

Inauguration
The statue was revealed to the public on 11 October 2017 in the presence of Marion Lemestre, Councilor for Economic Affairs of the City of Brussels.

References

Notes

Buildings and structures in Brussels
City of Brussels
Tourist attractions in Brussels
Bronze sculptures in Belgium
Statues in Belgium
Sculptures of men
Statues of musicians
2017 sculptures
Cultural depictions of Jacques Brel